Senator Dean may refer to:

Ashbel A. Dean (1857–1899), Vermont State Senate
Benjamin Dean (1824–1897), Massachusetts State Senate
Charles S. Dean Sr. (born 1939), Florida State Senate
Eliab B. Dean Jr. (1819–1900), Wisconsin State Senate
Josiah Dean (1748–1818), Massachusetts State Senate
Nathan Dean (1934–2013), Georgia State Senate
Robert P. Dean (1909–1984), Maryland State Senate
Robert W. Dean (1923–1999), Wisconsin State Senate
Sidney Dean (1818–1901), Rhode Island Senate

See also
Gilbert A. Deane (1851–1891), New York State Senate